William Sherley "Old Bill" Williams (January 3, 1787 – March 14, 1849) was a noted mountain man and frontiersman, known as Lone Elk to the Native Americans. Fluent in several languages, Williams served as an interpreter for the government and led several expeditions to the West.  He assimilated into the Osage Nation where he married the daughter of a chief, and never returned to European-American life.

Biography

Early life and education
Williams was born on January 3, 1787, on Horse Creek, a branch of the Pacolet River, under Skyuka Mountain in Polk County, North Carolina., the fourth son and the fourth child of nine born to Joseph and Sarah (Musick) Williams. He liked to explore and learned to trap animals for their furs, and found he had a gift for languages. In 1795, the family moved to settle near St. Louis, Missouri.

Career
Williams was a master fur trapper and trail guide, becoming fluent in several Native American languages among the tribes he knew the best.  He served as a sergeant and scout with the United States Rangers during the War of 1812. As he encountered local tribes, Williams would learn their languages and customs. His ability to communicate in the different languages made him valuable to the government and the military for tribal negotiations.

After military service, Williams became a Protestant preacher, and worked with some of the Native American tribes, moving west from Missouri to frontier areas.  During his early years, he lived with the Osage Indians in Missouri, and later with the Ute Indians.  While residing with the Osages he worked with the Harmony Mission to the Osages.  He translated the bible into the Osage language and was the interpreter for the 1825 treaty between the Osage and the United States.

By 1822 he was working as an independent trapper, and also guided travelers through the far western frontier of the time.  He was a respected figure among the mountain men and worked with many, including Uncle Dick Wooton, Joe Walker, Alexis Godey, George Nidever, Zenas Leonard, Antoine Leroux, Lucien Maxwell, William Thomas Hamilton, Dick Owens, Kit Carson, and, infamously, with John C. Frémont on his fourth expedition.  As an Indian fighter, he had noted encounters with Blackfeet, Apache, Comanche, and Modoc Indians.

Williams traveled through a wide territory, including Texas, California, the Rocky Mountains, Yellowstone, the Santa Fe Trail, Arizona, and the Colorado and Little Colorado River regions. Williams was with Joseph Walker's historic expedition which found, but did not enter, the Yosemite Valley.

Frémont's Fourth Expedition controversy 
In November 1848 Frémont sought Williams to lead a transcontinental railroad survey into Sangre de Cristo range after other mountain men had rejected Frémont's proposition. Once the team entered the mountains, Williams changed his mind due to the heavy early snowfall. He warned the party against continuing and insisted on a southern route.  Frémont continued, and the expedition was defeated within the San Juan Mountains, where 10 expedition members died of starvation and exposure.

Marriage and children 
Williams married A-Ci'n-Ga, a full-blood Osage woman whose name means 'Wind Blossom'. They became the parents of two daughters.

Mary Ann (Williams) Mathews (born September 1814)
Sarah (Williams) Mathews (born c1816) married John Allan Mathews after the death of her sister and was the grandmother of Osage tribal council member and writer John Joseph Mathews.

Death 
Williams died in March 1849, at age 62 when he was ambushed and killed by Ute warriors.  He had been returning to Taos, New Mexico after retracing the trail of an expedition in order to help find survivors.

Legacy and honors
"Old Bill" is portrayed in an 8-foot-tall bronze sculpture by B. R. Pettit, erected in 1980 in Bill Williams Monument Park in Williams, Arizona.  In addition to the park and town, several places and organizations in Arizona were named after him: Bill Williams River and Bill Williams Mountain, the Bill Williams Mountain Men of Williams, Arizona chapter of the Pioneer Club, and the Chautauqua Program: "Rendezvous With Old Bill Williams". He was portrayed by Slim Pickens in a Disney series entitled The Saga of Andy Burnett.

References

External links

 http://mojavedesert.net/people/williams.html
 http://oldbillwilliams.com/
 http://www.allthingswilliam.com/willynilly/oldbill.html
 http://www.legendsofamerica.com/we-explorerlist-w.html
 https://web.archive.org/web/20120307182753/http://www.mountainmanbronzes.com/Bill-Williams,-Mountain-Man-of-the-Santa-Fe-Trail.html
 https://web.archive.org/web/20110718052357/http://www.williamsnews.com/main.asp?SectionID=2&SubSectionID=2&ArticleID=6783&TM=68304.59
 http://www.williamsnews.com/main.asp?SectionID=63&SubSectionID=200&ArticleID=7661

1787 births
1849 deaths
American fur traders
Mountain men
People from Polk County, North Carolina